A Star for Two is a 1991 French-Canadian romantic drama film directed by Jimmy Kaufman and starring Lauren Bacall, Anthony Quinn, Jean-Pierre Aumont, and Lila Kedrova.

Plot
In the 1980s, two people reunite decades after a passioned wartime affair to find their love. However, they will find new complications when they try to restart their relationship.

Cast
Lauren Bacall as Edwige
Anthony Quinn as Dr. Gabriel Todd
Jean-Pierre Aumont as Alphonse
Lila Kedrova as Simone
Jacques Marin as Raymond
Francesco Quinn as Young Gabriel Todd
Colin Fox as Doctor

References

External links

1991 films
1991 romantic drama films
French romantic drama films
Canadian romantic drama films
Films set in the 1940s
Films set in the 1980s
Films shot in France
Metro-Goldwyn-Mayer films
French-language Canadian films
1990s English-language films
1990s Canadian films
1990s French films